Key to the Mint (1969–1996) was an American Thoroughbred racehorse.

Background
Bred  by Paul Mellon and raced under his Rokeby Stable colors, Key to the Mint was trained by future Hall of Fame inductee Elliott Burch.

Racing career
Key to the Mint did not run in the Kentucky Derby, the first race of the U.S. Triple Crown series, then finished third to winner Bee Bee Bee in the Preakness Stakes and fourth to Riva Ridge in the Belmont Stakes.

Following the Triple Crown races, Key to the Mint dominated his age group in 1972 and was voted the Eclipse Award for American Champion Three-Year-Old Male Horse. He continued to race at age four, notably winning the 1973 Excelsior Handicap and won on a sloppy track for 10 furlongs in winning the Suburban Handicap.

Stud record
Retired to stud duty, Key to the Mint sired Plugged Nickle, the 1980 American Champion Sprint Horse; Java Gold, a multiple Grade 1 winner and sire of Kona Gold; and Jewel Princess, the 1996 American Champion Older Female Horse. He is also the damsire of European Champion Swain and Canadian Champion 3-Year-Old Male Horse Key to the Moon.
Key to the Mint was euthanized due to infirmities of old age on September 21, 1996.

Pedigree

References
 Key to the Mint's pedigree and partial racing stats
 Video at YouTube of Key to the Mint winning the 1972 Travers Stakes

1969 racehorse births
1996 racehorse deaths
Racehorses bred in Virginia
Racehorses trained in the United States
Eclipse Award winners
Thoroughbred family 2-n
Chefs-de-Race